Bwindi may refer to:
 Bwindi Impenetrable Forest, a primeval forest located in southwestern Uganda
 Bwindi Impenetrable National Park, a park containing much of Bwindi Impenetrable Forest
 Bwindi gorilla, a population of mountain gorillas found in Bwindi Impenetrable Forest
 The 1999 Bwindi massacre of eight Western tourists to Bwindi Impenetrable National Park by the Army for the Liberation of Rwanda